The slender frog (Austrochaperina gracilipes) is a species of frog in the family Microhylidae.
It is found in Australia and New Guinea.
Its natural habitats are subtropical or tropical dry forests, subtropical or tropical swamps, moist savanna, rivers, and intermittent rivers.

References

Austrochaperina
Amphibians of Queensland
Taxonomy articles created by Polbot
Amphibians described in 1926
Frogs of Australia